The Mayor is the highest elected official in Savannah, Georgia. Since its incorporation in 1789, the City has had 67 mayors. Election for Mayor is held every four years, and is held as a non-partisan election.

List

Notes
† Deceased/murdered in office.

See also

 Savannah, Georgia
 Timeline of Savannah, Georgia
 Garden City, Georgia
 List of mayors of Garden City, Georgia
 List of mayors of Atlanta
 List of mayors of Augusta, Georgia
 List of mayors of Columbus, Georgia
 List of mayors of Macon, Georgia

Footnotes

 
Savannah, Georgia